Maxwell Bates  LL.D (14 December 1906 – 14 September 1980) was an architect and expressionist painter.

Biography
Born in Calgary, Alberta in 1906, Bates started painting at an early age; his piece In the Kitchen was painted when he was 15 years old.  As a young adult, he worked for his father's architecture firm.  His father, William Stanley Bates, was himself a prominent architect in early Calgary who designed the Burns Building (1912) and the Grain Exchange (1909).

Bates studied with Lars Jonson Haukaness at the Provincial Institute of Technology and Art in Calgary from 1926–1927. In 1931 Bates moved to England, where he supported himself as a door-to-door vacuum salesman while exhibiting his art work at the Wertheim Gallery.  In England he associated with promising young artists such as Barbara Hepworth and Victor Pasmore.

As a member of the British Territorial Army in 1940, Bates was captured in France and became a prisoner of war in Thuringia.  He remained a POW until 1945.  This experience was captured in his 1978 book A Wilderness of Days.

Bates returned to Calgary in 1946 to work with his father's architectural firm again. His first wife May Watson, whom he married in 1949, died in 1952.  He then married Charlotte Kintzle in 1954.

In 1949 Bates studied at the Brooklyn Museum with artist Max Beckmann and Abraham Rattner. As an architect, his most notable work was St. Mary's Cathedral, which was consecrated in 1957.

Bates suffered a stroke in 1961.  In 1962 he moved from Calgary to Victoria, British Columbia.  He suffered a second stroke in 1978 and died in Victoria in 1980.

His work has been showcased at art galleries worldwide and retrospective exhibitions have been shown in galleries such as the Winnipeg Art Gallery and the Vancouver Art Gallery. He was an associate member of the Royal Canadian Academy of Arts and a member of the C.S.P.W.C. (1951); C.S.G.A. (1947); the Alberta Society of Artists; the B.C. Society of Artists; F.C.A. (1947); the C.G.P.; and the Calgary Arts Club. In 1971, he received an honorary doctorate from the University of Calgary. In 1980 he was made a Member of the Order of Canada.

Honours 
 Royal Canadian Academy of Arts

References

External links
Some images of Bates's work
 Maxwell Bates, Lethbridge College Buchanan Art Collection
Historic Places of Canada

1906 births
1980 deaths
Artists from Calgary
Artists from Victoria, British Columbia
20th-century Canadian painters
Canadian male painters
Canadian people of British descent
Expressionist painters
Members of the Order of Canada
Members of the Royal Canadian Academy of Arts
Canadian ecclesiastical architects
Architects of Roman Catholic churches
20th-century Canadian architects
20th-century Canadian male artists